The second season of Too Hot to Handle premiered on June 23, 2021, and concluded on June 30, 2021. The season was ordered by Netflix in January 2021, with filming underway concurrently amid the COVID-19 pandemic on the Turks and Caicos Islands.

Cast

Other appearances 
Marvin Anthony previously appeared on Les Princes et les Princesses de l'Amour 4. Chase DeMoor starred on Floor Is Lava along with season 1 contestant Harry Jowsey. Chase and Melinda Melrose also starred on starred on Netflix’s Reality Games and were 2 of 4 players representing team "Too Hot to Handle". Peter Vigilante starred on The Reality House. Melrose hosts Dated & Related, another Netlfix reality show.

Episodes

After filming

References

2021 American television seasons